The 1983 Wisconsin Badgers football team represented the University of Wisconsin–Madison in the 1983 NCAA Division I-A football season.

Schedule

Personnel

Season summary

Michigan

    
    
    
    
    
    
    
    
    
    

On September 24, 1983, Wisconsin lost to Michigan, 38–21, before a crowd of 77,708 at Camp Randall Stadium in Madison, Wisconsin.

at Northwestern

Source:

at Ohio State

at Purdue

1984 NFL Draft

References

Wisconsin
Wisconsin Badgers football seasons
Wisconsin Badgers football